in Sagamihara, Kanagawa, Japan), is a singer-songwriter, actor, and model. He is a former member of the Japanese idol group KAT-TUN.

He joined the talent agency Johnny & Associates in 1999 and officially debuted as part of KAT-TUN in 2006. Apart from activities as a member of KAT-TUN, he has acted in the film Mohōhan, alongside SMAP's leader Masahiro Nakai, and appeared in several dramas, most notably hit drama Legal High.

After leaving KAT-TUN and Johnny & Associates began a career as a solo artist (first single release in November 2016) and also began doing some modeling.

In 2017 announced signed an exclusive two-year contract with Universal Music Group Single will be released April 2017 and will be his solo artist major label debut.

History
Taguchi officially joined Johnny & Associates in May 1999. He was selected to join KAT-TUN when it formed in 2001, and subsequently debuted with the group in 2006.

In 2001, he made his first appearance in a drama, in Omae no Yukichi ga Naiteiru. In 2005, he had his first drama lead role when he replaced agency mate Hiroki Uchi, who was temporarily suspended from activities, in Ganbatte Ikimasshoi.

Announced in 2015 that he would leave KAT-TUN and his management company. Final performance with KAT-TUN was in March 2016.  In September 2016, Taguchi opened his official website to announce launch of his solo career.  His first single, "Hero", was released in November 2016.

Started runway model work in March 2017 as well with his appearance in the Kobe Collection Fashion Show S/S 2017. Currently he is a print model for pnck.jp clothing and also announced print model work for Hombre Nino clothing in the 2017 season.

In April 2017, he had his major label solo debut single with Universal Music Group with "Connect". In June of the same year, he released his first photo book, titled .

On May 22, 2019, Taguchi was arrested along with his girlfriend, actress Rena Komine, for marijuana possession.

Appearances

Dramas
Omae no Yukichi ga Naiteiru (2001) as Haruki Hijikata
Shounen wa Tori ni Natta (2001)
Ganbatte Ikimasshoi (2005) as Saburō Nakata
Happy! (2006) as Keiichirō Ōtori
Happy!2 (2006) as Keiichirō Ōtori
Hanayome to Papa (2007) as Seiji Miura
Yūkan Club (2007) as Granmanie Bidō
Kochira Katsushikaku Kameari Kōenmae Hashutsujo (2009) as Kakunoshin Araki
Inu o Kau to Iu Koto ~Sky to Wagaya no 180-nichi~ (2011) as Katsuhiko Hotta
Legal High (2012) as Ranmaru Kaga
Osozaki no Himawari ~Boku no Jinsei, Renewal~ (2012) as Kaoru Aoyama
Legal High SP (2013) as Ranmaru Kaga
Nanatsu no Kaigi (2013) as Hiromitsu Saeki
Legal High Season 2 (2013) – Ranmaru Kaga
Kyouwa Kaisha Yasumimasu (2014) as So Oojiro

Movies
Mohōhan: Copycat Killer (2002) as Shinichi Tsukata

Stage plays
No Words, No Time ~Sora ni Ochita Namida~ (2013)
Forrest Gump (2014) as Forrest

TV programs
Kyōkun no Susume (2014–present) Regular guest

Radio
 Tokyo-FM Tag-Tune Driving Host
KAT-TUN no Gatsūn Co-host

Commercials
 Lotte
 Sou
 Crunky (2002)
 Plus X (2003)
 Rohto
 Mogitate Kajitsu (2005, 2007, 2008)
 Rohto C Cube (2005)
 Sesera (2006)
 SKY Perfect JSAT Corporation
 SKY PerfecTV! (2006)
 SKY PerfecTV Premium Service (2006)
 NTT DoCoMo
 New 9 Series (2006)
 FOMA903i (2006)
 GungHo Online Entertainment
 Puzzle & Dragons Z (2013)

Discography

Solo Artist Discography

Solo songs as a KAT-TUN member

Awards and recognitions
2007: 11th Nikkan Sports Drama Grand Prix: Runner-up for Best Supporting Role for Yūkan Club
2008: 5th TVNavi Magazine Awards: Best Newcomer for Hanayome to Papa

References

External links
 
 Junnosuke Taguchi profile on Johnny's net
 KAT-TUN J-One Records Official Website
 Junnosuke Taguchi Official Website
Junnosuke Taguchi Universal Music Japan Universal J Official Website

1985 births
KAT-TUN members
Johnny & Associates
Universal Music Japan artists
Living people
Japanese male pop singers
Japanese idols
Musicians from Kanagawa Prefecture
21st-century Japanese singers
21st-century Japanese male singers